Gonipterus gibberus is a species of weevil in the family Curculionidae. It is commonly known as the eucalyptus snout beetle, the eucalyptus weevil or the gum tree weevil. It feeds and breeds on Eucalyptus trees and is endemic to Australia.

Description
This weevil is greyish-brown with a light coloured transverse band. It is about thirteen millimetres long and not readily distinguishable from the closely related weevil, Gonipterus scutellatus, which shares the same common names. The larvae are yellowish-green with dark markings and no green stripes on the abdomen, which distinguishes them from larvae of G. scutellatus.

Host plants
Eucalyptus trees are the only hosts for the gum tree weevil. The species most susceptible to attack include Eucalyptus camaldulensis, Eucalyptus globulus, Eucalyptus maidenii, Eucalyptus punctata, Eucalyptus robusta, Eucalyptus smithii and Eucalyptus viminalis.

Distribution
The gum tree weevil is endemic to Australia where Eucalyptus trees are native. The weevil has spread to South America, either as eggs and larvae on imported planting material or in soil, and is found in Argentina, Uruguay and the states of Paraná, Rio Grande do Sul and Santa Catarina in Brazil.

Life history
Over a period of about three months, adult female gum tree weevils lay about two hundred eggs in batches of about ten contained in grey coloured capsules attached to leaves. These hatch after about a week and the larvae begin to feed on leaves and young shoots. After moulting three times, the larvae crawl or fall to the ground where they pupate a few centimetres beneath the surface. The weevil's life cycle takes seven to eleven weeks from egg laying to maturity, depending on the temperature. In Mauritius there are about four generations annually and the weevils breed throughout the year. In South Africa there are two generations and they overwinter as adults.

Significance
The gum tree weevil is of little economic significance in Australia where it has natural enemies. In other countries where Eucalyptus has been introduced, that is not the case. Adult gum tree weevils feed mostly on leaves and the soft bark of twigs while the larvae feed mostly on leaves. Heavy infestations cause die back of shoots which may result in the development of epicormic shoots. Repeated defoliations may cause the splitting and death of branches or even whole trees.

References 

Gonipterini
Insect pests of temperate forests
Beetles of Australia
Beetles described in 1835